The Boss of Big Town is a 1942 American film directed by Arthur Dreifuss.

Cast
John Litel as Michael Lynn
Florence Rice as Linda Gregory
H. B. Warner as Jeffrey Moore
John Miljan as Craige
Jean Brooks as Iris Moore
David Bacon as Dr. Gil Page
Mary Gordon as Mrs. Lane
Frank Ferguson as Bram Hart
Lloyd Ingraham as Insp. Torrence
John Maxwell as Foster
Paul Dubov as Graham
Patricia Prest as Frances Hart

External links 

1942 films
American mystery films
1942 crime drama films
1942 romantic drama films
American black-and-white films
Producers Releasing Corporation films
American romantic drama films
American crime drama films
Films directed by Arthur Dreifuss
1940s English-language films
1940s American films